The 1957–58 Southern Football League season was the 55th in the history of the league, an English football competition.

After Llanelly left the league at the end of the previous season, the league consisted of 21 clubs from previous season plus Poole Town, who were elected from the Western League. Gravesend & Northfleet were champions, winning their first Southern League title. Six Southern League clubs applied to join the Football League at the end of the season, but none were successful.

The following season the league split into two divisions, a North-West Division and a South-East Division, with thirteen new clubs elected to make up the numbers.

League table

Football League elections
Six Southern League clubs applied for election to the Football League. However, none were successful as all four League clubs were re-elected.

References

Southern Football League seasons
S